Black Pond Township is an inactive township in Oregon County, in the U.S. state of Missouri.

Black Pond Township was established in the 1880s, taking its name from a pond of the same name within its borders. The precise location of the former lake is unknown to the GNIS.

References

Townships in Missouri
Townships in Oregon County, Missouri